Tom Beauvais (born 1932) is a British artist, best known for film posters.

Beauvais was born in Belsize Park, North London in 1932, the son of Arnold Beauvais.

He designed the poster for the 1969 film Butch Cassidy and the Sundance Kid.

He designed and illustrated the UK poster for Mad Max in 1979.

References

1932 births
Living people
Film poster artists
British illustrators
People from Belsize Park